Rachel Ann Daly (born 6 December 1991) is an English professional footballer who plays for Aston Villa in the FA Women's Super League and the England national team. Since 2019 she has played in defence, midfield, and attack. Previously, she played for Houston Dash.

College career
Despite playing just three years for the St. John's University Red Storm, Daly set the school's career records for both goals (50) and points (111). As a freshman, she did not see game action due to NCAA compliance regulations. During her second year, she played and started in all 21 games and set St. John's single-season records in goals (23) and points (50), becoming the program's first-ever player to be named a NSCAA All-American, after earning Second Team honours.

As a junior, she was the team's leading player in points with 18, including eight goals and two assists. As a senior, she appeared in 20 games, making 19 starts, and finished as the leading scorer on the team with 19 goals and five assists for a total of 18 points. She became the first player in program history to be selected to the NSCAA All-America First Team and the first to be named a semifinalist for the Hermann Trophy.

Club career

Houston Dash
Daly was selected by NWSL club Houston Dash as the sixth overall pick of the 2016 NWSL College Draft. The NWSL Media Association voted Daly Player of the Week for the first week of the season after she contributed a goal and an assist in the Dash's 3–1 win against the Chicago Red Stars. She appeared in 16 games in the 2016 season, tallying four goals and four assists.

Daly returned to the Dash for the 2017 season, appearing in 23 games and scoring five goals. On 20 November 2017, the Houston Dash announced that Daly had signed a new contract with the club.

In the 2018 season, Daly was named Player of the Week for week nine, as well as Player of the Month for the month of May. Daly started all 24 games for the Dash and scored a career high 10 goals. She was voted team MVP and named to the NWSL Second XI for the 2018 season.

Daly was named captain of the Dash ahead of the 2020 NWSL Challenge Cup. The Dash won the Cup, their first trophy, after a 2–0 win over the Chicago Red Stars in the final. Daly won the tournament Golden Boot and on 25 July 2020 was named tournament MVP.

Loan to West Ham United
On 3 September 2020, Daly joined West Ham United on a loan that expired 11 January 2021.

Aston Villa
On 9 August 2022, it was announced that Daly had signed a three-year deal with Aston Villa. She made her competitive debut for the club on 18 September that year, scoring 2 goals in a 4–3 win over Manchester City.

International career
Daly has represented England at the U-15, U-17, U-19, and U-23 levels. She was a member of England's U-17 FIFA Women's World Cup team that finished fourth in New Zealand in 2008.

When Mark Sampson replaced Hope Powell as England coach, he named Daly in his first squad in December 2013. She won her first senior cap in June 2016, scoring in England's 7–0 UEFA Women's Euro 2017 qualifying win over Serbia. Daly was left off Sampson's squad for Euro 2017.

After not being called up for nearly a year, Daly was included in England's squad for the 2018 SheBelieves Cup by new head coach Phil Neville. Daly featured in four of England's World Cup qualifying games in 2018, as England won their group and qualified for the 2019 World Cup. She won the 2019 SheBelieves Cup with England, where she appeared in two games and played all 90 minutes in a 2–2 draw against the United States.

In July 2022 Daly was included, and started every game at left back, with the England squad which won UEFA Women's Euro 2022. In November 2022, she started her first international match as a forward during a series of friendlies in which manager Sarina Wiegman was trying out options to replace the perennial but recently-retired number 9 Ellen White, with Daly saying "she will play wherever Wiegman needs her".

On 19 February 2023, Daly was once again played as a centre-forward in an Arnold Clark Cup match against Italy: in the occasion, she scored a brace that helped England gain a 2–1 win.

Great Britain Olympic
In May 2021, Daly was named to the Team GB squad as one of six defenders in the squad. She appeared in all four games for Team GB, starting in three of the games.

Personal life
She previously dated Dash teammate Kristie Mewis.

Career statistics

College

Club

International
Statistics accurate as of match played 22 February 2023.

Scores and results list England's goal tally first, score column indicates score after each Daly goal.

Honours
Leeds United
FA Women's Premier League Cup: 2010

Houston Dash
NWSL Challenge Cup: 2020

England

UEFA Women's Championship: 2022
SheBelieves Cup: 2019
Arnold Clark Cup: 2022, 2023
Individual
NWSL Second XI: 2018, 2021
NWSL Challenge Cup Most Valuable Player: 2020
NWSL Challenge Cup Best XI: 2020
NWSL Challenge Cup Golden Boot: 2020
FA Women's Super League Player of the Month: September 2022
Freedom of the City of London (announced 1 August 2022)

References

Further reading
 Aluko, Eniola (2019), They Don't Teach This, Random House, 
 Caudwell, Jayne (2013), Women's Football in the UK: Continuing with Gender Analyses, Taylor & Francis, 
 Clarke, Gemma (2019), Soccerwomen: The Icons, Rebels, Stars, and Trailblazers Who Transformed the Beautiful Game, 
 Dunn, Carrie (2019), Pride of the Lionesses: The Changing Face of Women's Football in England, Pitch Publishing (Brighton) Limited, 
 Dunn, Carrie (2016), The Roar of the Lionesses: Women's Football in England, Pitch Publishing Limited, 
 Grainey, Timothy (2012), Beyond Bend It Like Beckham: The Global Phenomenon of Women's Soccer, University of Nebraska Press, 
 Smith, Kelly (2012), Footballer: My Story, Transworld, 
 Stay, Shane (2019), The Women's World Cup 2019 Book: Everything You Need to Know About the Soccer World Cup, Books on Demand, 
 Theivam, Keiran and Jeff Kassouf (2019), The Making of the Women's World Cup: Defining stories from a sport's coming of age, Little,

External links

 St. John's player profile
 Houston Dash player profile
 Rachel Daly at National Women's Soccer League
 Profile at the Football Association website

 

1991 births
Living people
English LGBT sportspeople
LGBT association football players
Lesbian sportswomen
English women's footballers
St. John's Red Storm women's soccer players
Houston Dash players
National Women's Soccer League players
Leeds United Women F.C. players
Notts County L.F.C. players
West Ham United F.C. Women players
FA Women's National League players
Women's Super League players
USL W-League (1995–2015) players
England women's under-23 international footballers
England women's international footballers
Olympic footballers of Great Britain
Houston Dash draft picks
Sportspeople from Harrogate
Women's association football forwards
Women's association football defenders
2019 FIFA Women's World Cup players
Footballers at the 2020 Summer Olympics
English expatriate sportspeople in the United Arab Emirates
English expatriate women's footballers
Expatriate women's soccer players in the United States
Pali Blues players
UEFA Women's Euro 2022 players
UEFA Women's Championship-winning players
Aston Villa W.F.C. players
Los Angeles Strikers players